Dandou Kibonge Selenge (born 30 May 1976) is a Congolese footballer who played as a midfielder. He played in 13 matches for the DR Congo national team from 1992 to 1999. He was also named in the DR Congo's squad for the 1998 African Cup of Nations tournament.

References

External links
 

1976 births
Living people
Democratic Republic of the Congo footballers
Association football midfielders
Democratic Republic of the Congo international footballers
1998 African Cup of Nations players
Belgian Pro League players
R. Charleroi S.C. players
Democratic Republic of the Congo expatriate footballers
Democratic Republic of the Congo expatriate sportspeople in Belgium
Expatriate footballers in Belgium
Place of birth missing (living people)
21st-century Democratic Republic of the Congo people